Great Needle Peak (variant name in ) is the summit of the central Levski Ridge in Tangra Mountains on Livingston Island, Antarctica.  Rising to 1,679.5 m, it is the third highest peak of both the mountains and the island after Mount Friesland (1700.2 m) and St. Boris Peak (1685 m). Great Needle Peak surmounts Huron Glacier and its tributary draining Devnya Valley to the north, Magura Glacier to the east, Srebarna Glacier to the south, and Macy Glacier to the southwest.

History
The peak's name derives from the Spanish name form pico Falsa Aguja (False Needle Peak) that probably dates back to 1957, with ‘great’ becoming established in usage and considered more suitable than ‘false’ as this heavily glaciated, major peak could hardly be associated with the ‘true’ Needle Peak (pico Aguja), a sharp rocky peak of elevation just 370 m situated near Samuel Point 8 km away.

The first ascent and GPS survey of Great Needle Peak was made on 8 January 2015 by the Bulgarian mountaineers Doychin Boyanov, Nikolay Petkov and Aleksander Shopov from Camp Academia locality (541 m) via Lozen Saddle (437 m) and Plana Peak (740 m). Their measured peak elevation of 1,679.5 m) updated the previously existing estimate (1,690 m according to the Bulgarian topographic survey Tangra 2004/05), and confirmed that the summit of both the mountains and the island is indeed the 1700.2 m high Mount Friesland.

Location
The peak is located 6.7 km east of Mount Friesland, 3.32 km east by south of Levski Peak, 2.21 km south-southeast of Plana Peak, 2.54 km south of Sitalk Peak and 1.84 km south of Tutrakan Peak, 2.15 km southwest of Helmet Peak, 3.32 km northwest of M'Kean Point, 1.29 km north of Serdica Peak, and 470 m southeast of Sofia Peak (1655 m) with which it forms a twin peak.

Maps
 Chart of South Shetland including Coronation Island, &c. from the exploration of the sloop Dove in the years 1821 and 1822 by George Powell Commander of the same. Scale ca. 1:200000. London: Laurie, 1822
 South Shetland Islands. Scale 1:200000 topographic map. DOS 610 Sheet W 62 60. Tolworth, UK, 1968.
 Islas Livingston y Decepción.  Mapa topográfico a escala 1:100000.  Madrid: Servicio Geográfico del Ejército, 1991.
 S. Soccol, D. Gildea and J. Bath. Livingston Island, Antarctica. Scale 1:100000 satellite map. The Omega Foundation, USA, 2004.
 L.L. Ivanov et al., Antarctica: Livingston Island and Greenwich Island, South Shetland Islands (from English Strait to Morton Strait, with illustrations and ice-cover distribution), 1:100000 scale topographic map, Antarctic Place-names Commission of Bulgaria, Sofia, 2005
 L.L. Ivanov. Antarctica: Livingston Island and Greenwich, Robert, Snow and Smith Islands. Scale 1:120000 topographic map. Troyan: Manfred Wörner Foundation, 2010.  (First edition 2009. )
 Antarctic Digital Database (ADD). Scale 1:250000 topographic map of Antarctica. Scientific Committee on Antarctic Research (SCAR). Since 1993, regularly upgraded and updated.
 L.L. Ivanov. Antarctica: Livingston Island and Smith Island. Scale 1:100000 topographic map. Manfred Wörner Foundation, 2017. 
 A. Kamburov and L. Ivanov. Bowles Ridge and Central Tangra Mountains: Livingston Island, Antarctica. Scale 1:25000 map. Sofia: Manfred Wörner Foundation, 2023.

See also
 Tangra Mountains
 Livingston Island
 South Shetland Islands
 Antarctica

Gallery

Notes

References
 Bulgarian Antarctic Gazetteer. Antarctic Place-names Commission. (in Bulgarian; cf. the "Levski Ridge" entry)
 Pico Falsa Aguja. SCAR Composite Antarctic Gazetteer.

External links
 Great Needle Peak. Copernix satellite image

Tangra Mountains
Mountains of Antarctica